Renal artery stenosis (RAS) is the narrowing of one or both of the renal arteries, most often caused by atherosclerosis or fibromuscular dysplasia. This narrowing of the renal artery can impede blood flow to the target kidney, resulting in renovascular hypertension – a secondary type of high blood pressure. Possible complications of renal artery stenosis are chronic kidney disease and coronary artery disease.

Signs and symptoms
Most cases of renal artery stenosis are asymptomatic, and the main problem is high blood pressure that cannot be controlled with medication. Decreased kidney function may develop if both kidneys do not receive adequate blood flow, furthermore some people with renal artery stenosis present with episodes of flash pulmonary edema.

Cause
Renal artery stenosis is most often caused by atherosclerosis which causes the renal arteries to harden and narrow due to the build-up of plaque. This is known as atherosclerotic renovascular disease, which accounts for about 90% of cases. This narrowing of renal arteries due to plaque build-up leads to higher blood pressure within the artery and decreased blood flow to the kidney. This decreased blood flow leads to decreased blood pressure in the kidney, which leads to the activation of the Renin-Angiotensin-Aldosterone (RAA) system. Juxtaglomerular cells secrete renin, which converts angiotensinogen to angiotensin I, which is then converted to angiotensin II by angiotensin converting enzyme (ACE). Angiotensin II then acts on the adrenal cortex to increase secretion of the hormone aldosterone. Aldosterone causes sodium and water retention, leading to an increase in blood volume and blood pressure. Therefore, people with RAS have chronic high blood pressure because their RAA system is hyperactivated.

Pathophysiology
The pathophysiology of renal artery stenosis leads to changes in the structure of the kidney that are most noticeable in the tubular tissue. If the stenosis is longstanding and severe, the glomerular filtration rate in the affected kidneys never recovers and (prerenal) kidney failure is the result.

Changes include:
 Fibrosis
 Tubular cell size (decrease)
 Thickening of Bowman capsule
 Tubulosclerosis
 Glomerular capillary tuft (atrophy)

Diagnosis

The diagnosis of renal artery stenosis can use many techniques to determine if the condition is present, a clinical prediction rule is available to guide diagnosis.

Among the diagnostic techniques are:
 Doppler ultrasound study of the kidneys
 Refractory hypertension
 Auscultation (with stethoscope) - bruit ("rushing" sound)
 Captopril challenge test
 Captopril test dose effect on the differential renal function as measured by MAG3 scan.
 Renal artery arteriogram.

The specific criteria for renal artery stenosis on Doppler are an acceleration time of greater than 70 milliseconds, an acceleration index of less than 300 cm/sec² and a velocity ratio of the renal artery to aorta of greater than 3.5.

Treatment

Atherosclerotic renal artery stenosis
It is initially treated with medications, including diuretics, and medications for blood pressure control. When high-grade renal artery stenosis is documented and blood pressure cannot be controlled with medication, or if renal function deteriorates, surgery may be resorted to. The most commonly used procedure is a minimally-invasive angioplasty with or without stenting. It is unclear if this approach yields better results than the use of medications alone. It is a relatively safe procedure. If all else fails and the kidney is thought to be worsening hypertension and revascularization with angioplasty or surgery does not work, then surgical removal of the affected kidney (nephrectomy) may significantly improve high blood pressure.

Fibromuscular dysplasia
Angioplasty alone is preferred in fibromuscular dysplasia, with stenting reserved for unsuccessful angioplasty or complications such as dissection.

See also
 Renovascular hypertension

References

Further reading

External links

Articles containing video clips
Kidney diseases